Raintime is an Italian progressive / power metal band, founded in 1999. The band was initially significantly inspired by Dream Theater, and as such composed songs which leaned towards the progressive metal genre. They then recorded an instrumental demo entitled Jump in the Past.

After the demo was released, the band's original drummer quit and Enrico Fabris replaced him. Also, Claudio Coassin, who played keyboards, switched to vocals, leaving keyboards to Andrea Corona. Their sound evolved into a new hybrid and borrows elements both from extreme metal, such as death growls and lower tuning of their instruments, and from more melodic genres, especially in regard to keyboards and vocals. With this new direction, the band recorded their debut album Tales from Sadness in 2005 with Arise Records. The second "official" chapter of the band, Flies & Lies (Lifeforce), released in 2007 and produced by Tommy Handsen, gave Raintime the possibility to perform live at ProgPower USA with bands like After Forever, Virgin Steele and Sonata Arctica.

Their latest album, entitled Psychromatic, was released on 16 March 2010.

Raintime stated on their Facebook on 27 May 2012 that the band would be disbanding due to "too many new members". 
Claudio, Enrico and Ivan, however, are working on a side project called Fake Idols.

Members
 Claudio Coassin – vocals
 Daniele "Acido" Bressa – lead guitar
 Ivan Odorico – guitar
 Dario Battiston – bass
 Andrea Corona – keyboards
 Enrico Fabris – drums
Parham Amini – bass (studio)

Discography
 Jump in the Past (Demo, Self-Produced, 2000)
 Tales From Sadness (Album, Arise, 2005)
 Flies & Lies (Album, Lifeforce, 2007)
 Psychromatic (Album, Lifeforce, 2010)

References

External links
 Raintime's official website
 Raintime at Myspace
 [ Raintime] @ AllMusic

Italian power metal musical groups
Italian progressive metal musical groups